Etienne Oosthuizen (born 22 December 1992) is a South African rugby union footballer. His regular playing position is either lock or flanker. He represents  in the French Top 14.

References

External links
 
 itsrugby.co.uk profile

Living people
1992 births
South African rugby union players
Golden Lions players
Lions (United Rugby Championship) players
Rugby union locks
People from Rustenburg
Afrikaner people
South African expatriate rugby union players
Expatriate rugby union players in Australia
South African expatriate sportspeople in Australia
ACT Brumbies players
Sharks (rugby union) players
Rugby union players from North West (South African province)